European Parliament elections were held in Italy on 10 June 1979. They were held a week after general election and the failure to hold the two elections together caused much controversy for wasting public money.

Electoral system
The pure party-list proportional representation was the traditional electoral system of the Italian Republic since its foundation in 1946, so it was naturally adopted to elect the Italian representatives to the European Parliament. Two levels were used: a national level to divide seats between parties, and a constituency level to distribute them between candidates. Italian regions were united in 5 constituencies, each electing a group of deputies. At national level, seats were divided between party lists using the largest remainder method with Hare quota. All seats gained by each party were automatically distributed to their local open lists and their most voted candidates.

Results 
This election taking place just a week after the general election, it obviously gave a similar result. However, the minor importance of the European ballot caused a lower turnout, which particularly punished the two major parties, the Christian Democracy and the Italian Communist Party. The small Italian Liberal Party had a breath of fresh air from this vote, doubling its percentage compared to seven days before.

External links
Italian Minister of Interior

Italy
European Parliament elections in Italy
European